Alexandre Léauté (born 12 October 2000 in Saint-Caradec) is a French Paralympic cyclist who won gold in Cycling at the 2020 Summer Paralympics – Men's individual pursuit C2. In qualifying he broke the world record and did so again in the final.

References

External links
 

Living people
2000 births
Paralympic cyclists of France
French male cyclists
Cyclists at the 2020 Summer Paralympics
Medalists at the 2020 Summer Paralympics
Paralympic gold medalists for France
Paralympic silver medalists for France
Paralympic bronze medalists for France
Sportspeople from Côtes-d'Armor
Paralympic medalists in cycling
Cyclists from Brittany
21st-century French people